Mariya Dimova may refer to:
 Mariya Dimova (skier)
 Mariya Dimova (snowboarder)